The Bold Ones: The Senator (also known as The Senator) is an American political television drama series that aired on NBC from 1970 through 1971, lasting for nine episodes (including one pilot movie). The series stars Hal Holbrook as Senator Hays Stowe, an idealistic crusader of political and social issues.

The Senator was part of The Bold Ones, a rotating series of dramas that also included The New Doctors (with E.G. Marshall), The Lawyers (with Burl Ives), and The Protectors (with Leslie Nielsen).

As a group of dramas, The Bold Ones was nominated for nine Emmy Awards and won five awards. It was also nominated for a Golden Globe for Best Drama TV Show. In 1971, Holbrook won an Emmy Award for  Outstanding Continued Performance by an Actor in a Leading Role in a Dramatic Series for his role in the series.

The series was based on an earlier television movie, A Clear and Present Danger.

Cast

Main cast

 Hal Holbrook as Senator Hays Stowe, an idealistic crusader of political and social issues who frequently came into conflict with old-line politicians and entrenched special interest groups.
 Sharon Acker as Erin Stowe, Hays' wife.
 Cindy Eilbacher as Norma Stowe, Hays' daughter.
 Michael Tolan as Jordan Boyle, Hays' administrative aide.

Guest stars
 Ed Binns made two appearances as Arthur in the episodes: "A Continual Roar of Musketry: Part 1 and Part 2"
 Dana Elcar made one appearance as Collie Ford in "Some Day, They'll Elect a President"
 Michael C. Gwynne made one appearance as Whitney in: "Power Play"
 Kevin Hagen made one appearance as Joseph Lick in: "The Day the Lion Died"
 Bernie Hamilton made two appearances as Dr. Edwards in the episodes: "A Continual Roar of Musketry: Part 1 and Part 2" 
 Lincoln Kilpatrick made one appearance as Isaac Johnson in: "A Single Blow of the Sword"
 Randolph Mantooth made two appearances as the young National Guard officer in the episodes: "A Continual Roar of Musketry: Part 1 and Part 2"
 Burgess Meredith made one appearance as State Party Chairman Mallon in: "Power Play"
 John Randolph made three appearances as Governor Keler including the episodes: "A Continual Roar of Musketry: Part 1 and Part 2" 
 Louise Sorel made one appearance as Mary in the episode: "George Washington Told a Lie"

Episodes

Pilot (1970)

Season 1 (1970–71)

Home media
Timeless Media Group released The Bold Ones: The Senator- The Complete Series on DVD in Region 1 on June 16, 2015.

Awards

Primetime Emmy Award
 Outstanding Achievement in Film Editing for Entertainment Programming - For a Series or a Single Program of a Series – Michael Economou (For episode "A Continual Roar of Musketry", parts I & II)
 Outstanding Continued Performance by an Actor in a Leading Role in a Dramatic Series – Hal Holbrook
 Outstanding Directorial Achievement in Drama - A Single Program of a Series with Continuing Characters and/or Theme – Daryl Duke (For episode "The Day the Lion Died")
 Outstanding Series - Drama – David Levinson
 Outstanding Writing Achievement in Drama – Joel Oliansky (For episode "To Taste of Death But Once")

References

External links
 
 

1970 American television series debuts
1971 American television series endings
American political drama television series
English-language television shows
NBC original programming
Television series by Universal Television
Television shows set in Washington, D.C.
Primetime Emmy Award for Outstanding Drama Series winners